Georges-Henri Denys Arcand  (born June 25, 1941) is a French Canadian film director, screenwriter and producer. His film The Barbarian Invasions won the Academy Award for Best Foreign Film in 2004. His films have also been nominated three further times, including two nominations in the same category for The Decline of the American Empire in 1986 and Jesus of Montreal in 1989, becoming the only French-Canadian director in history whose films have received this number of nominations and, subsequently, to have a film win the award. For The Barbarian Invasions, he received an Academy Award nomination for Best Original Screenplay, losing to Sofia Coppola for Lost in Translation.

During his four decades career, he became the most internationally recognized director from Quebec, winning several awards from the Cannes Film Festival, including the Best Screenplay Award, the Jury Prize, and many other prestigious awards worldwide. He won three César Awards in 2004 for The Barbarian Invasions: Best Director, Best Original Screenplay and Best Film, the only Canadian director to have done so.

Early life
Arcand was born in Deschambault, Quebec, Canada. He grew up in a devoutly Roman Catholic home in a village about 40 km southwest of Quebec City. He attended Jesuit school for nine years. Entering his teen years, the family moved to Montreal and although he dreamed about being a professional tennis player, while studying for a master's degree in history at the Université de Montréal he became involved in film making, which gave him a new sense of direction.

Career
In 1963, he joined the National Film Board of Canada where he produced several award-winning documentaries in his native French language. A social activist, he made a feature-length documentary in 1970 titled Cotton Mill, Treadmill (On est au coton) that showed the exploitation of textile workers. The film caused an uproar that resulted in it not being distributed publicly for several years. Arcand received such publicity that it gave his fledgling career a great boost. He also worked on some television series, notably Duplessis, a historical work he wrote (but did not direct) about Premier Maurice Duplessis.

During the early part of the 1970s, Arcand produced a number of feature films that received critical acclaim. Arcand returned to directing documentaries and did no work for television. In 1982, his documentary, Comfort and Indifference (Le confort et l'indifférence) won the Prix Luc-Perreault from the Quebec Film Critics' Association. In 1986 he wrote and directed what was until then the highest-grossing film in Quebec (and Canadian) history, The Decline of the American Empire (Le Déclin de l'empire américain).

At the Canadian Genie Awards, it captured best film,  best director, and best writer of an original screenplay. It also won the "International Critics Prize" at the Cannes Film Festival and became the first Canadian feature film nominated for an Academy Award for Best Foreign Language Film.  Three years later Arcand repeated this award-garnering performance with his widely acclaimed 1989 film Jesus of Montreal (Jésus de Montréal) winning the same three Genie awards, plus the Jury Prize at Cannes. The movie earned him a second Academy Award nomination, becoming the first Canadian director to accomplish this achievement.

Arcand produced and directed his first English language film in 1993, titled Love and Human Remains, and did so again in 2000, with the film Stardom, which opened the Toronto International Film Festival.  He then spent two years writing the script for what many claim is his finest piece of cinematic writing to date, The Barbarian Invasions (Les invasions barbares). Released in 2003, the film won Arcand the Best Screenplay Award at the Cannes Film Festival, was nominated for a Golden Globe Award as Best Foreign Language Film and won the Academy Award for Best Foreign Language Film. In addition, Denys Arcand was nominated for an Academy Award for Writing Original Screenplay. The Barbarian Invasions won France's 2004 César Award for Best Picture, Best Director, and Best Original Screenplay.

Arcand's film Days of Darkness (L'Âge des ténèbres) was chosen to close the 2007 Cannes Film Festival. The press opening was subdued and the subsequent reviews were mixed. Following this, he took a seven-year hiatus from feature film directing; he returned in 2014 with the film Le règne de la beauté.

Awards

In 1988, he was made an Officer of the Order of Canada and was promoted to Companion in 2005. In 1990 the Government of France awarded him the Legion of Honour. He finally earned from his home province one of its highest distinctions, the title of Knight of the National Order of Quebec, in 1990.

In 1995, Mr. Arcand received a Governor General's Performing Arts Award for Lifetime Artistic Achievement. In February 2004, the government of France named Denys Arcand a Commander of L'Ordre des Arts et des Lettres, that nation's highest cultural honour. In 2004, Arcand was also inducted into Canada's Walk of Fame.

He is a member of the Royal Canadian Academy of Arts.

Personal life
Arcand is a lapsed Catholic. Married a second time, neither Arcand nor Denise Robert, his producer/wife, has had children. He was 55 years old when they adopted an orphaned baby boy from China named Carter. His brother Bernard Arcand (1945–2009) was a professor of anthropology, and his youngest brother Gabriel Arcand (b. 1949) is a noted Canadian actor.

Filmography

Director
À l'est d'Eaton - 1959, short film co-directed with Stéphane Venne
Alone or With Others (Seul ou avec d'autres) - 1962, co-directed with Denis Héroux and Stéphane Venne
Dirty Money (La maudite galette) - 1972
Réjeanne Padovani - 1973
Gina - 1975
Empire, Inc. - 1983, TV miniseries codirected with Douglas Jackson
The Crime of Ovide Plouffe (Le Crime d'Ovide Plouffe) - 1984
The Decline of the American Empire (Le Déclin de l'empire américain) - 1986
Jesus of Montreal (Jésus de Montréal) - 1989
Les lettres de la religieuse portugaise - 1991, TV movie
Montreal Stories - 1992, segment "Vue d'ailleurs"
Love and Human Remains - 1993
Poverty and Other Delights (Joyeux Calvaire) - 1996
Stardom - 2000
The Barbarian Invasions (Les invasions barbares) - 2003
Days of Darkness (L'Âge des ténèbres) - 2007
An Eye for Beauty (Le règne de la beauté) - 2014
The Fall of the American Empire (La chute de l'empire américain) - 2018

Documentaries
Champlain - 1964, short film
Québec 1603 - Samuel de Champlain - 1964, short film
Les Montréalistes - 1965, short film
Montréal, un jour d'été - 1965, short film
La route de l'Ouest - 1965, short film
Volleyball - 1966, short film
Parcs atlantiques - 1967, short film
Quebec: Duplessis and After (Québec : Duplessis et après...) - 1972
La lutte des travailleurs d'hôpitaux - 1976, short film
Cotton Mill, Treadmill (On est au coton) - 1976 (made 1970 but withheld from release)
Comfort and Indifference (Le confort et l'indifférence) - 1982

Acting
It Isn't Jacques Cartier's Fault (C'est pas la faute à Jacques Cartier) - 1968
Nominingue... depuis qu'il existe - 1968
My Eye (Mon oeil) - 1971
Dirty Money (La maudite galette) - 1972
Réjeanne Padovani - 1973
Pigs Are Seldom Clean (On n'engraisse pas les cochons à l'eau claire) - 1973
Normande (La Tête de Normande St-Onge) - 1975
Night Zoo (Un zoo la nuit) - 1987
Jesus of Montreal (Jésus de Montréal) - 1989
Montreal Stories (Montréal vu par...) - 1991
Léolo - 1992
Un gars, une fille - 2000
The Barbarian Invasions (Les Invasions barbares) - 2003
Tideline - 2004
Idole instantanée - 2005
Les Bougon - 2004-06
Days of Darkness (L'Âge des ténèbres) - 2007
Barney's Version - 2010
Adam & Ève - 2012
Kiss Me Like a Lover (Embrasse-moi comme tu m'aimes) - 2016
Les pêcheurs - 2016, TV series

References

Further reading
 Michel Coulombe, Denys Arcand. La vraie nature du cinéaste, (entretiens), Montréal: Boréal 1993
 André Loiselle, Brian McIllroy (éd.), Auteur/Provocateur. The Films of Denys Arcand, Westport: Praeger 1995

External links
 
 Denys Arcand at the Canadian Film Encyclopedia
 Denys Arcand on NFB

1941 births
Canadian screenwriters in French
Directors of Best Foreign Language Film Academy Award winners
César Award winners
European Film Awards winners (people)
Companions of the Order of Canada
French Quebecers
Best Director Genie and Canadian Screen Award winners
Grand Officers of the National Order of Quebec
Recipients of the Legion of Honour
Living people
Commandeurs of the Ordre des Arts et des Lettres
Members of the Royal Canadian Academy of Arts
People from Capitale-Nationale
Film directors from Quebec
Université de Montréal alumni
Best Screenplay Genie and Canadian Screen Award winners
Best Director César Award winners
Male actors from Quebec
Governor General's Performing Arts Award winners
Canadian documentary film directors
National Film Board of Canada people
Prix Albert-Tessier winners
Cannes Film Festival Award for Best Screenplay winners
Critics of the Catholic Church
Best Director Jutra and Iris Award winners
Film producers from Quebec